The Special Boat Squadron (abbreviated as SBS) is the Sri Lanka Navy's elite special forces unit, modeled after the British Special Boat Service. It was raised in 1993.

It forms part of the Sri Lanka Special Forces, alongside the Commando Regiment (CR), Army Special Forces Regiment (SF), and Air Force Special Forces (SLAFSF).

Role

The SBS was modeled after the Special Boat Service of the Royal Navy. In its role as a naval special forces unit it takes up a wide variety of operations such as amphibious raids, maritime counter-terrorism, reconnaissance and target indication, combat swimmer missions and small boat operations. As a Special Forces unit, its role is not limited to water-borne operations. The SBS conducts operations on land, together with the Commando Regiment (CR) and Special Forces Regiment (SF), with regular ground combat units of the Navy and the Army and on many occasions autonomously.

The roles of the Special Boat Squadron are predominantly focused on, but not restricted to, 
Small boat operations in support of littoral operations.
Covert beach reconnaissance (hydrographic survey) in advance of amphibious assault.
Covert assault route preparation in advance of amphibious assault.
Recovery or protection of ships subject to terrorist action.
Maritime counter-terrorism.
Reconnaissance and target indication in the deep battlespace.
Assault on verified targets.
VBSS operation (Visit Board Search & Seizure).
VIP protection.

History
Due to frequent resistance and various asymmetric tactics near the naval troop deployed areas in the country, the Sri Lanka Navy (SLN) recognized the imminent need to raise a specially trained counter terrorist team and realized the value of special operations in the early stages of confronting separatist terrorism that exist in the country for over three decades. Although not formerly commissioned, the urge for action of a few young and unique officers and men who were more than willing to put themselves in harm's way at the enemy's doorstep, was evident in the early confrontation with the LTTE. Among them, Lieutenant Commander Shanthi Bahar had been a pioneer to lead a small team of specially trained sailors seeking LTTE hideouts in the jungles and thickets of Trincomalee. His untimely death in action delayed the foundation of a naval special force by many years.

The LTTE grew from a guerrilla group to a quasi-conventional force, and the Sea Tigers to a considerable strength. The LTTE and its war fighting mechanism solely depended on the Sea Tiger force for survival, first on the logistic train from the high seas, kept open in spite of a determined offensive of the Navy. Secondly, the Sea Tigers were an irritable distraction that taxed the Navy's resources to keep sea lines of communication with the Northern Peninsula. Thirdly, the Sea Tigers mastered asymmetric warfare with suicide boats, divers, mines and littoral attacks in coastal waters and lagoons

The creation of the SBS was conceptualised Lieutenant Commander Shanthi Bahar, who led a its informal predecessor, a team of specially trained sailors in jungles of Trincomalee. In 1993 Lieutenant Commander Ravi Wijegunartne began the formally creation of a special unit with rapid strike capability along with Commander Cedric Martenstyn. The Special Boat Squadron of the Sri Lanka Navy was formerly inaugurated on 18 January 1993 at SLNS Elara in Karainagar, the major naval base in the Jaffna Peninsula in the early nineties. The first batch of two aspiring officers and 76 sailors, mostly recruits and a few Leading rates, joined on voluntary commitment to form the future elite commando of the Navy. Nevertheless, the toll of training attrition was high, as only the strong remained and the weak faded away throughout the rigorous training process. Finally, both officers and 25 of the ratings survived to form the nucleus of the Special Boat Squadron under the charismatic leadership of Lieutenant Commander RC Wijegunaratne. Two subalterns, Lieutenant Channa Jayasinghe and Sub Lieutenant SW Gallage, were willing and dedicated officers who would dare the impossible to strike the enemy, as they had proven again and again in small group raids they did during their stints. Moreover SBS developed training on special boat tactics to fight in brown waters and coastal shallows. Soon the squadron grew up into a versatile force capable of covert and overt operations on land and sea. Capacity building and rigorous training made the force capable of clandestine waterborne entry and even air mobile to operate deep in enemy controlled land. The versatility includes pre-assault special missions in amphibious landing and small boat tactics to battle with the enemy in close-quarters surface combat.

The first litmus test for SBS to examine their readiness came even before completion of training to establish an amphibious lodgement to reinforce the besieged Poonaryn camp. The entire amphibious landing had been a joint affair, though SBS alongside boat crews of in-shore patrol craft and dinghies had played a pivotal role in the assault wave under enemy fire.

Starting as a small element by securing significant victories, the Special Boat Squadron fought with heavily armed, highly manoeuvrable Arrow Craft, to seal the fate of the LTTE until the end of separatist war against the LTTE.

Notable members
 Chief Petty Officer K. G. Shantha - awarded the Parama Weera Vibhushanaya posthumously
  Admiral Ravindra Wijegunaratne - Founding Commander of the unit
 Lieutenant Commander Samantha Waruna Gallage - Recipient of WWV, RWP, RSP. Killed in action in Vettalakerni 1996 and a founding officer of the SBS

See also
Military of Sri Lanka
Military ranks and insignia of the Sri Lanka Navy

References

External links
Sri Lanka Navy – Special units
Ministry of Defence Sri Lanka
Sri Lanka Navy
Three Intakes of Sailors along with Elite SBS Contingent pass out at SLNS Nipuna

Sri Lanka Navy
Special forces of Sri Lanka
Counterterrorism in Sri Lanka
Sri Lanka Navy squadrons
Military units and formations established in 1993
Naval special forces units and formations